Renuka Dasgupta (22 August 1910 – 1 January 1991) was a Bengali singer, best known for the songs of Atulprasad Sen. She was a direct disciple of Atulprasad Sen, Kazi Nazrul Islam and Dilipkumar Roy.

Early life
Born in Konnagar, West Bengal, Dasgupta lived in Gaya, Dhaka and Calcutta.  She was a cousin of Sahana Devi, Atulprasad Sen, Kanak Biswas (née Das). Dasgupta taught music in Kamrunnesa Girls High School at Tikatuli, Dhaka in the late 1920s. She married Hirendra Chandra Dasgupta, a graduate engineer of Bengal Engineering College in the early 1930s and settled permanently in Calcutta. She was associated with the radio audition committee of All India Radio (AIR) in Calcutta.

Early work
 In 1932, three Indian recording companies were formed in Calcutta out of a nationalistic urge to compete with the British-owned Gramophone Company of India. One of these was Hindusthan Records. The owner C.C. Saha requested Rabindranath Tagore to record some songs and recitations. From those recordings were published the first record, H1. Atulprasad Sen recorded two songs which were published in the second record, H2. The third record, H3, had the songs "" (kirtan) and "" (Atulprasad) sung by Renuka Sengupta. Sales of this record reached an unprecedented high.

Dasgupta was also trained by Kazi Nazrul Islam and recorded two songs under his tutelage, Krishna Chandra Dey. The recorded song was "". In 1935 she was trained by Sailajaranjan Majumdar to sing Rabindra Sangeet songs chosen for her by Rabindranath Tagore. She went on to record five Rabindra Sangeets in her career.

Recorded Rabindra Sangeets 

 "" (1935) 
 "" (1935)
 "" 
 ""
 ""

Recorded Nazrul Geeti 
 ""
 ""

Recorded songs of Atul Prasad 

 "" (1932)
 ""
 ""
 ""
 "" (1969–70) 
 ""
 ""
 ""
 ""
 ""
 ""
 ""
 "" (1969–70)
 "" (1969–70)
 ""
 ""
 ""
 ""

Recorded songs in other genres (list incomplete) 

 "" (kirtan)
 ""
 ""Jnanadas (kirtan)
 "" (bhatiyali)
 "" (kirtan)
 "" (kirtan)
 ""

References

Bengali singers
1991 deaths
1910 births
Singers from Kolkata
Rabindra Sangeet exponents
20th-century Indian singers
20th-century Indian women singers
Women musicians from West Bengal
20th-century women composers
19th-century women composers